Timber Fury is a 1950 American Western film directed by Bernard B. Ray and starring David Bruce, Laura Lee and Nicla Di Bruno.

Plot

Cast
 David Bruce as Jim Caldwell 
 Laura Lee as Phyllis Wilson 
 Nicla Di Bruno as Yvonne 
 Sam Flint as Henry Wilson 
 George Slocum as Arnold McCabe 
 Lee Phelps as Sheriff Williams 
 Gil Frye as Pete 
 Paul Hoffman as Spike 
 Spencer Chan as Chung
 Myron Healey as Paxton Man
 Ray Jones as Barfly 
 Hank Mann as Joe, the Bartender

References

Bibliography
 Pitts, Michael R. Western Movies: A Guide to 5,105 Feature Films. McFarland, 2012.

External links
 

1950 films
1950 Western (genre) films
American Western (genre) films
Films directed by Bernard B. Ray
Eagle-Lion Films films
American black-and-white films
Films set in forests
Films about lumberjacks
Films scored by Raoul Kraushaar
Films based on works by James Oliver Curwood
1950s English-language films
1950s American films